Floyd Lloyd (born Lloyd Seivright, 3 June 1948, in St. Ann, Jamaica – 6 November 2018) was a Jamaican reggae musician and singer who is best known for his 1982 hit, "Jah Jah Why?". 

His first vocals were Wirl Studio recordings Rich Man Poor Man and Be Yourself in 1967.

He died on 6 November 2018 at the age of 70.

Discography
Better To Laugh Than To Cry (1982)
Tear It Up: The Ska Album (1997)
Our World (1998)
Alchemy (2001)
Believer (2002)
Mind Over Matter (2004)

References

1948 births
2018 deaths
Jamaican reggae musicians
People from Saint Ann Parish
20th-century Jamaican male singers
21st-century Jamaican male singers